Arthur Junior Gardner (born September 21, 1952) is a former outfielder in Major League Baseball who played for the Houston Astros and San Francisco Giants in part of three seasons spanning 1975–1978. Gardner was the Astros' opening day center fielder in 1977.

Baseball career
Gardner was selected out of South Leake High School in Walnut Grove, Mississippi in the 2nd round (36th overall) of the 1971 June amateur Baseball draft by the Houston Astros.

References

External links
, or Baseball Reference (Minor and Japanese leagues), or Retrosheet, or Pura Pelota (Venezuelan Winter League)

1952 births
Living people
African-American baseball players
Baseball players from Mississippi
Cedar Rapids Astros players
Cocoa Astros players
Columbus Astros players
Covington Astros players
Denver Bears players
American expatriate baseball players in Japan
Hiroshima Toyo Carp players
Houston Astros players
Iowa Oaks players
Major League Baseball outfielders
Memphis Blues players
Navegantes del Magallanes players
American expatriate baseball players in Venezuela
Phoenix Giants players
People from Leake County, Mississippi
San Francisco Giants players
Tulsa Drillers players